A cryptogenic species ("cryptogenic" being derived from Greek "κρυπτός", meaning hidden, and "γένεσις", meaning origin) is a species whose origins are unknown.  The cryptogenic species can be an animal or plant, including other kingdoms or domains, such as fungi, algae, bacteria, or even viruses.

In ecology, a cryptogenic species is one which may be either a native species or an introduced species, clear evidence for either origin being absent. An example is the Northern Pacific seastar (Asterias amurensis) in Alaska and Canada.

In palaeontology, a cryptogenic species is one which appears in the fossil record without clear affinities to an earlier species.

See also
Cosmopolitan distribution
Cryptozoology

References

Further reading 
 
 

Ecology terminology